Joseph E. Todaro (September 18, 1923 – December 26, 2012), sometimes known by the nicknames "Leadpipe Joe" or "Papa Joe" was a prominent Buffalo, New York businessman, and the Mafia boss of the Buffalo crime family. He was usually referred to as Joseph Todaro Sr. to distinguish him from his son Joseph Todaro Jr.

Biography
Joseph Todaro was born to Anthony Todaro and Sarah Frangiamore on September 18, 1923. He later married Josephine Santamauro and had two children, his son Joseph Jr. and daughter Linda (later she married Peter Gerace).

Joseph Todaro Sr., known as "Lead Pipe Joe" to his crime family associates was a caporegime in the Buffalo family who reportedly controlled bookmaking operations along with his son, Joseph Todaro Jr. and his brother Richard Todaro. By the early 1960s, longtime Buffalo crime family boss, Stefano Magaddino, had begun his retirement and left the day-to-day activities of the crime family to acting boss, Frederico Randaccio. During the 1960s and 1970s, Randaccio's base of operations was the Blue Banner Social Club located on Prospect Ave. The club was controlled by family soldier Benny Spano. Todaro Sr. was a big earner in the Buffalo family, controlling numerous rackets of bookmaking, card and dice games, loansharking rings, Las Vegas junkets and labor rackets. In May 1967, Todaro Sr. and 35 other men were arrested at party. He was charged with "consorting with known criminals,” a charge that was later dismissed in court.

On March 13, 1982, Todaro was involved in a large brawl outside of the Buffalo Playboy Club while trying to help Daniel Sansanese, Jr. According to FBI logs, Todaro conducted mob affairs and meetings from local hotel rooms and VIP rooms out of the Executive Inn, the 747s disco and the old Playboy Club, which were all located near the Greater Buffalo International Airport in Cheektowaga, New York.

In 1984, Buffalo family boss Samuel Frangiamore retired.  Todaro Sr. became the new boss and made his son Joseph Todaro Jr. the new underboss in the family. Todaro Sr. was acquitted of federal tax evasion charges in 1985, after it was alleged he had underreported his income for years 1976, 1977 and 1978. 

In 1989, an FBI statement was filed in connection with a gambling investigation, identifying Todaro Sr. and his son, Todaro Jr., as the leaders of a 45 made member Buffalo Mafia family that was in control of various criminal activities, including labor racketeering, bookmaking, loansharking and narcotics trafficking. The court statements also claimed that Joseph Todaro Jr. was running the Mafia family because his father, Todaro Sr., was in semi-retirement, splitting time between his Tonawanda and Florida homes. It was also stated that Leonard F. Falzone was running a local loansharking operation while brothers Victor and Daniel Sansanese were controlling bookmaking for the Todaro's. The FBI had also bugged Falzone's union-owned car in 1988 to link the Todaros to the illegal gambling case, but the device was unable to provided any evidence of that link.

On September 6, 1993, his grandson Joseph Edward Todaro III (the son of Joseph Todaro Jr.) married Dana Christine Panepinto, the daughter of Donald Panepinto.

In 1996 Todaro Sr. and his son, Todaro Jr., were listed among 24 alleged organized crime figures who were accused of influencing the Laborers International Union of North America since the 1960s.

In late 1996, Los Angeles crime family Underboss Carmen Milano reached out to Todaro Sr. about joining forces to take over a loan sharking and auto insurance fraud racket in Las Vegas controlled by Herbert Blitzstein a Chicago Outfit associate. It was decided by Carmen Milano that Todaro Sr. would receive a piece of the Blitzstein rackets in Las Vegas. The two Mafia families arranged that Buffalo family soldier Robert Panaro would be the fence for Blitzstein's jewelry.

In 1999, Joseph E. Todaro Sr., along with his son, Joseph A. Todaro Jr., and 16 others were named in a civil racketeering lawsuit for controlling local 210 through the years by various racketeering acts. The court complaint identified Joseph E. Todaro Sr. as boss and his son, Joseph A. Todaro Jr., as underboss of the Buffalo family and the owners of La Nova Pizzeria. Todaro Sr., never belonged to local 210, but his son, Todaro Jr., served as Local 210 business manager in 1990 before resigning. The charges were based on the testimony of Ronald M. Fino, a former business manager of Local 210 before he became an FBI informant.

In June 2004, Todaro Sr. was a “person of interest” in the unsolved 1965 murder of Charles Gerass, who had been shot and left in a car trunk, but the investigation led to no charges against Todaro Sr. or anyone else. In 2006, Todaro Sr. retired and Todaro Jr. become boss, with Leonard Falzone acting under him until his death in 2016. 

The FBI and the U.S. Justice Department made numerous allegations that Todaro Sr. and his son, Todaro Jr., were the leaders of the Buffalo’s La Cosa Nostra family, but they were never able to prove this in court. Todaro Sr. lived his entire life without being convicted of a felony crime. Outside of organized crime, Todaro Sr. operated La Nova Pizzeria in Buffalo. He founded La Nova Pizzeria in 1957, which grew from one small West Side restaurant to a multimillion-dollar business that sells frozen chicken wings, pizzas and hot sauces. In 2001, Todaro Sr. opened a second La Nova pizzeria location on Main Street in Amherst. Todaro Sr. loved smoking cigars and going to the horse tracks. He also enjoyed a friendship with Anthony Masiello, the former Buffalo city mayor.

Todaro Sr. died on December 26, 2012, at age 89 following a lengthy illness.

References

Notes

Sources
United States. Congress. House. Committee on the Judiciary. Subcommittee on Crime. Administration's Efforts Against the Influence of Organized Crime in the Laborer's International Union of North America. 1997. 
Griffin, Joseph. Mob Nemesis: How the F.B.I. Crippled Organized Crime. Prometheus Books, 2002. 
Kurek, Albert S. The Troopers Are Coming II: New York State Troopers 1943–1985. AuthorHouse, 2006. 
Giancana, Sam. Burnstein, Scott M. Family Affair: Greed, Treachery, and Betrayal in the Chicago Mafia. Penguin, 2010.

Further reading
Capeci, Jerry. The Complete Idiots Guide To the Mafia: The Buffalo Family. Alpha Books, 2002. 
Dubro, James. Mob Rule: Inside the Canadian Mafia. MacMillan, 1985. 
Humphreys, Adrian. The Enforcer: Johnny Pops Papalia, A Life and Death In the Mafia. Harper Collins, 2002. 
Milhorn, H. Thomas. Crime: Computer Viruses to Twin Towers. Boca Raton, Florida: Universal Publishers, 2005. 
Nicaso, Antonio and Lamothe, Lee. Global Mafia: The New World Order of Organized Crime. Toronto: Macmillan Canada, 1995.

External links
La Nova Pizzeria – Wing Company Website

1923 births
2012 deaths
American gangsters of Italian descent
Buffalo crime family
American crime bosses